Mun Tae-jun (born 1970) is a South Korean poet.

Career
Mun Tae-jun has published several poetry collections since his prize-winning debut in 1994, and the great artistic potential of his works have gained the attention of many literary artists and critics.

Mun Tae-jun's poems employ a comforting language to soothe the wounds of the soul. His poems seek to assuage the pains of those suffering from the violence and oppression of a heartless society. He values "conversation" highly, emphasizing full empathy between two existences, such as when he says, "That over there, is in me here; and I here, am in that over there. Let me respect that which is not me, and therefore those things that are me." The poet aspires to a state in which the subject and object are not distinct form one another, but fused together. In this respect, Mun Tae-jun carries on the traditional lyrical tradition. His poetry collection The Development of Dusk (2008) was translated to English by Kim Won-Chung and Christopher Merrill and published as The Growth of a Shadow (2012). A handful of his other works have also been translated.

Selected works

Works in translation
 The Growth of a Shadow: Selected Poems of Taejoon Moon (2012) - translated by Kim Won-Chung and Christopher Merrill

Works in Korean (partial)

Poetry collections
 Crowded Backyard (2000) 
 Bare Feet (2004) 
 Flatfish (2006) 
 The Development of Dusk (2008) 
 A Distant Place (2012) 
 Our Final Face (2015) 
 What Is the End of What I Long For? (2018)

Prose collections
 Embrace: Holding You, I Am Stained (2007)

Awards
 Dongseo Literary Prize (2004) 
 Nojak Literary Prize (2004) 
 Midang Literary Award (2005) - for "누가 울고 간다"
 Yushim Literary Prize (2006)
 Sowol Poetry Prize (2006) - for "그맘때에는"

References 

1970 births
South Korean writers
South Korean poets
Living people
Midang Literary Award winners
South Korean Buddhists